Green Line of Namma Metro was built along with the Purple Line during the first phase of construction of the metro rail system for the city of Bengaluru, Karnataka, India. The 30.5 km line connects Nagasandra in the northwest to Silk Institute in the south. The line connects the industrial centers of Peenya and Yelahanka in the north with the central hub of Majestic and the southern residential areas of Bangalore (Basavanagudi, Jayanagar, Banshankari etc.). Green Line is mostly elevated, with 26 elevated stations and 3 underground stations. The Line passes through Majestic station which is an interchange station between Green and Purple Lines.

When Phase II is completed, the line will stretch from Madavara in northwest to Silk Institute in the South.

History
Green Line sections were opened as indicated below.

Phase I
Construction work on Reach 3 and 3A of Phase I of the Namma Metro began in 2009–10. The total cost of the project on this stretch was 2,100 crore. Work on the underground section commenced in May 2011. TBMs named Kaveri, Krishna and Godavari were used for tunnel boring work for the Green Line. The first trial run on the Green Line was conducted on 8 August 2013.

Construction required 1.3 lakh tonnes of concrete, 44,500 tonnes of steel bars, and 190 km of high tension wires weighing 2900 tonnes. A total of 395 piers, including station piers and portals, were constructed on the stretch. The tallest pier of the viaduct is a 21-metre pier between Kuvempu Road and Sriramapura stations, opposite Gayatri Devi Park. There 353 spans on the stretch, the longest being the 66-metre curved span over the railway track off Sriramapura. The total roofing area of the 10 stations on the stretch was 47,000 square metres.

The first section of Green Line was opened to public on 1 March 2014. BMRCL Managing Director Pradeep Singh Kharola stated that about 25,000 passengers traveled on the line on the opening day.

TBM Godavari began drilling the 970-metre underground section between Sampige Road and Majestic stations in April 2014. Godavari broke down a few months later, and needed to have its cutter head replaced. The machine broke down due to tough terrain including hard rock and boulders. The cutter head had to be imported from Italy. The machine restarted work in September 2015. Godavari completed drilling and emerged on the Majestic station end of the tunnel on 19 April 2016. Meanwhile, Kaveri and Krishna continued drilling the underground section between National College and Nadaprabhu Kempegowda station.

Construction of the underground section of Green Line required the use of 3,000 transit mixer loads of concrete. 1,000 km of cable had to be laid.

Trial runs on the elevated section between National College and Yelachenahalli began on 23 November 2016. Trials were conducted between National College and Jayanagara initially at a speed of 10 km/h, and then along the entire elevated section between National College and Yelachenahalli at a speed of 25 km/h. Trial runs began in the tunneled section on 30 March 2017.

Services at Sampige Road, Srirampura and Kuvempu Road stations were suspended between 13 and 22 March 2017 to allow authorities to conduct static and other tests and to link Sampige Road station with Nadaprabhu Kempegowda station. During the 10-day testing period, services operated only between Nagasandra and Rajajinagar stations. The BMTC introduced special feeder bus services to transport passengers from Rajajinagara to Hosahalli. Services between Sampige Road and Rajajinagara were suspended again for four days beginning 13 April 2017 to conduct trial runs on the underground section between Sampige Road and National College. Trial runs were completed on 16 May 2017.

Phase II
Contract for construction of the 6.5 km Reach 4B from Yelachenahalli to Silk Institute (previously named Anjanapura) was awarded to Nagarjuna Construction Co. The extension was estimated to cost . Civil work on the extension began in October 2016 and was completed by 2020. Trial runs were conducted on 18–19 December 2020 following which the extension was inaugurated on 14 January 2021, making it the first section of Phase II to start commercial operations.

In October 2016, BMRCL invited bids for the construction of viaduct and stations on the 3.031 km extension (Reach 3C) of the Green Line from Nagasandra to Madavara (previously named Bengaluru International Exhibition Centre). Reach 3C was awarded to Simplex Infrastructure Limited in late February 2017. The start of construction on the extension was delayed by 4 months due to land acquisition issues concerning land near Jindal Aluminium Limited in Kirloskar Layout. The issues were resolved and construction began in June 2017. Construction work on Reach 3C is expected to be ready by June–August 2022.

Stations

There will be 32 stations on the Green Line. Of these, 29 are currently operational. Each station has around 60 surveillance cameras. Passenger lifts and escalators are provided at all stations.

Infrastructure

Rolling stock
BMRC procured 150 metro coaches for fifty 3-car train sets in DMC-TC-DMC formation for Phase l of Namma Metro from BEML-Hyundai Rotem at a cost of Rs 1,672.50 crore (Rs 16.72 billion). Coach specifications were as follows. Dimensions: Length-20.8m, Width-2.88m, and Height-3.8m. Each coach has a seating capacity of about 50 and standing capacity of 306 (basis 8 per sqm). Thus, each train had a capacity of about 1000. Traction was through four 180kW motors in each motor coach. The trains have a maximum speed of 80 km/h and axle load of 15 tonnes. The trains operate on 750V DC with third rail bottom power collector system. Features include stainless steel body fully air-conditioned coaches, longitudinal bank of wide seats, wide vestibules between coaches, non-skid and non-slip floor surfaces, wi-fi enabled, four wide passenger access doors on each side, wide windows, automatic voice announcement system and electronic information and destination display system.

Initial operations on the Green Line began with twenty-one 3-coach trains. As loads increased with increasing ridership, all trains were converted to six coaches. Rolling stock on the Green Line are silver with a streak of bright green along its length.

Power
Power is supplied to the Green Line from the Peenya sub-station of the Karnataka Power Transmission Corporation Ltd. (KPTCL).

Signaling
In September 2009, the consortium led by Alstom Project India Limited were awarded a contract worth ₹563.4 crore (US$79.0 million) to supply control and signalling system for the first phase of the project. The consortium is led by Alstom and composed of Alstom Transport SA, Thales Group Portugal S A and Sumitomo Corporation. Alstom will provide the design, manufacture, supply, installing, testing and commissioning of the train control and signalling system and Thales will provide the design, installing, testing and commissioning of the telecommunication system for Phase I of the metro system. It includes the Urbalis 200 Automatic Train Control system which will ensure optimal safety, flexible operations and heightened passenger comfort.

The integrated control centre at Baiyyappanahalli has direct communication with trains and stations are CCTV fitted with visual and audio service information.

Operations

Frequency and capacity
Trains initially operated on the Green Line from 6 am to 11 pm. This was extended from 5AM to 11PM from 1 December 2015. The frequency along the line was 15 minutes between 5AM and 8AM and 8PM and 11PM, and 10 minutes between 8AM and 8PM. Trains halt for 30 seconds at each station. The 24.2 km journey is usually covered in about 42 minutes. Each six-coach train has a capacity of 2,004 passengers.

See also
Namma Metro
 Purple Line
 Yellow Line
 Pink Line
 Blue Line
 Orange Line
 List of Namma Metro Stations
 Rapid transit in India
 List of metro systems

References

External links
 Bangalore Metro Rail Corporation Ltd. (Official site)

Namma Metro lines
Railway lines opened in 2014
2014 establishments in Karnataka
Japan International Cooperation Agency